Robert Anthony Sklar (December 3, 1936 – July 2, 2011) was an American historian and author specializing in the history of cinema.

Sklar began his career as a reporter for the Los Angeles Times. He received a Ph.D. in the History of American Civilization from Harvard University in 1965. In 1968, he signed the "Writers and Editors War Tax Protest" pledge, vowing to refuse tax payments in protest against the Vietnam War.

He was a history professor at the University of Michigan, and in 1977, became a professor of cinema in the Department of Cinema Studies at New York University Tisch School of the Arts.

Early life and biography 
Sklar was born on December 3, 1936 in New Brunswick, New Jersey. His father was a high school teacher in Highland Park, New Jersey. Sklar was 9 years old when his family moved to Long Beach, California, where he went to Long Beach Polytechnic High School and was the editor of the school newspaper. Later, at Princeton University, Sklar served as chairman of the editorial board of The Daily Princetonian. After receiving his bachelor's degree in 1958, he worked on the rewrite desk in the Associated Press bureau in Newark and as a writer and reporter for the Los Angeles Times before doing graduate study at the University of Bonn on a Fulbright Scholarship from 1959-1960.

Sklar received a doctorate from Harvard in 1965. His dissertation became the title of his first book, F. Scott Fitzgerald: The Last Laocoon (1967).

Sklar was married twice and had two children. He had an older brother, Marty Sklar, who was the former creative head of Walt Disney Imagineering. On July 2, 2011, Sklar died while on vacation in Barcelona, aged 74, from a brain injury sustained in a bicycle accident.

Books 

 (with an introductory essay by Robert Sklar)

References

External links

1936 births
2011 deaths
20th-century American historians
20th-century American journalists
21st-century American historians
American film historians
American newspaper reporters and correspondents
American tax resisters
Cycling road incident deaths
Deaths from head injury
Harvard University alumni
Historians from New Jersey
Los Angeles Times people
New York University faculty
Princeton University alumni
Road incident deaths in Spain
Tisch School of the Arts faculty
University of Michigan faculty
Writers from Long Beach, California
Writers from New Brunswick, New Jersey